C. T. Ahammed Ali (born 5 April 1944) is an Indian politician. He is a Former Member of the Kerala Legislative Assembly from the Kasargod Assembly constituency since 1980 to 2011. He is associated with the Indian Union Muslim League.

Early life 
Ali was born to C. T. Abdullah and K. Khadeejabi on April 5, 1944 in Chemad.

Personal life 
Ali was married to A. Ummalimma and they have 4 children together, 1 son and 3 daughter.

References 

Indian Union Muslim League politicians
Kerala MLAs 1980–1982
1944 births
Kerala MLAs 1982–1987
Kerala MLAs 1987–1991
Kerala MLAs 1991–1996
Kerala MLAs 1996–2001
Kerala MLAs 2001–2006
Kerala MLAs 2006–2011
Living people